Michele Piva (born 1 September 1965) is a Sammarinese swimmer. He competed at the 1984 Summer Olympics and the 1988 Summer Olympics.

References

External links
 

1965 births
Living people
Sammarinese male swimmers
Olympic swimmers of San Marino
Swimmers at the 1984 Summer Olympics
Swimmers at the 1988 Summer Olympics
Place of birth missing (living people)